This Is Your Country On Drugs: The Secret History of Getting High in America is a 2009 nonfiction book by Ryan Grim. Topics covered include the prohibition of LSD and anti-cannabis public service announcements. Publishers Weekly said it was a "sharp critique of anti-drug programs". The Austin Chronicle recommended it as a holiday gift for "the hard-to-buy-for drug policy reformer on your list". It has been required reading in university public health curricula, and cited in a RAND Corporation drug policy research paper.

References

Further reading

External links
Ryan Grim talked about his book This Is Your Country On Drugs: The Secret History of Getting High in America, Washington Journal, C-SPAN, July 17, 2009

American books about cannabis law reform
2009 non-fiction books
Non-fiction books about cannabis
Books about politics of the United States
Books about LSD
Drug policy of the United States